My Life and Times is an American drama television series that aired on ABC from April 24, 1991 to May 30, 1991. The series co-starred Helen Hunt.

Premise
Set in 2035 and 2036, the series focused on 85-year-old former journalist Ben Miller. From his rocking chair at the Briars Retirement Retreat, Ben would recollect on an event from his life which would be dramatized in the episode. Among the events shown were the 1989 San Francisco earthquake, the 1987 stock market crash, "The Great Collapse of 1998" and the turn of the millennium.

Cast
Tom Irwin as Ben Miller
Megan Mullally as Susan
Helen Hunt as Rebecca Miller
Matt McGrath as Robert Miller
Harriet Medin as Jessie

Episodes

References

External links

 My Life and Times at Television Obscurities

1990s American drama television series
1991 American television series debuts
1991 American television series endings
English-language television shows
American Broadcasting Company original programming
Television shows set in San Francisco
Television series by Disney–ABC Domestic Television
Television series set in 1978
Television series set in 1981
Television series set in 1985
Television series set in 1987
Television series set in 1989
Television series set in 1998
Television series set in 1999
Television series set in 2000
Television series set in the 2030s
Fiction featuring the turn of the third millennium